The Black-Cole House (also known as the John B. Kelly House) is a historic plantation house located near Eastwood, Moore County, North Carolina.

Description and history 
It is dated to about 1815, and is a one-story, four bay, frame dwelling with Federal/Greek Revival style design elements. The house rests on a brick pier foundation, has a clipped gable roof, and full-width engaged front porch. It has a low, three-bay hip-roof rear wing added in the mid-19th century.

It was added to the National Register of Historic Places on September 18, 1978.

References

Plantation houses in North Carolina
Houses on the National Register of Historic Places in North Carolina
Houses completed in 1815
Federal architecture in North Carolina
Greek Revival houses in North Carolina
Houses in Moore County, North Carolina
National Register of Historic Places in Moore County, North Carolina